Pride is defined by Merriam-Webster as "reasonable self-esteem" or "confidence and satisfaction in oneself". However, "pride" sometimes is used interchangeably with "conceit" or "arrogance" (among other words) with negative connotations. Oxford defines it as "the quality of having an excessively high opinion of oneself or one's own importance." This may be related to one's own abilities or achievements, positive characteristics of friends or family, or one's country. Richard Taylor defined pride as "the justified love of oneself", as opposed to false pride or narcissism. Similarly, St. Augustine defined it as "the love of one's own excellence", and Meher Baba called it "the specific feeling through which egoism manifests."

Philosophers and social psychologists have noted that pride is a complex secondary emotion which requires the development of a sense of self and the mastery of relevant conceptual distinctions (e.g. that pride is distinct from happiness and joy) through language-based interaction with others. Some social psychologists identify the nonverbal expression of pride as a means of sending a functional, automatically perceived signal of high social status.

Pride is sometimes viewed as corrupt or as a vice, sometimes as proper or as a virtue. With a positive connotation, pride refers to a content sense of attachment toward one's own or another's choices and actions, or toward a whole group of people, and is a product of praise, independent self-reflection, and a fulfilled feeling of belonging.
With a negative connotation pride refers to a foolishly and irrationally corrupt sense of one's personal value, status or accomplishments, used synonymously with hubris. 
While some philosophers such as Aristotle (and George Bernard Shaw) consider pride (but not hubris) a profound virtue, some world religions consider pride's fraudulent form a sin, such as is expressed in Proverbs 11:2 of the Hebrew Bible. In Judaism, pride is called the root of all evil. When viewed as a virtue, pride in one's abilities is known as virtuous pride, the greatness of soul or magnanimity, but when viewed as a vice it is often known to be self-idolatry, sadistic contempt, vanity or vainglory. Other possible objects of pride are one's ethnicity, and one's sexual identity (especially LGBT pride).

Etymology
Proud comes from late Old English prut, probably from Old French prud "brave, valiant" (11th century) (which became preux in French), from Late Latin term prodis "useful", which is compared with the Latin prodesse "be of use". The sense of "having a high opinion of oneself", not in French, may reflect the Anglo-Saxons' opinion of the Norman knights who called themselves "proud".

Ancient Greek philosophy 
Aristotle identified pride (megalopsuchia, variously translated as proper pride, the greatness of soul and magnanimity) as the crown of the virtues, distinguishing it from vanity, temperance, and humility, thus:

He concludes then that

By contrast, Aristotle defined the vice of hubris as follows:

Thus, although pride and hubris are often deemed the same thing, for Aristotle and many philosophers hubris is altogether an entirely different thing from pride.

Psychology 
Since pride is classified as an emotion or passion, it is pride both cognitive and evaluative and that its object, that which it cognizes and evaluates, is the self and its properties, or something the proud individual identifies with. Like guilt and shame, it is specifically described in the field as a self-conscious emotion that results from the evaluations of the self and one's behavior according to internal and external standards. This is further explained by the way pride results from satisfying or conforming to a standard while guilt or shame is an offshoot of defying it. An observation cites the lack of research that addresses pride because it is despised as well as valued in the individualist West where it is experienced as pleasurable.

Emotion 
In psychological terms, positive pride is "a pleasant, sometimes exhilarating, emotion that results from a positive self-evaluation". It was added by Tracy et al. to the University of California, Davis, Set of Emotion Expressions (UCDSEE) in 2009, as one of three "self-conscious" emotions known to have recognizable expressions (along with embarrassment and shame).

The term "fiero" was coined by Italian psychologist Isabella Poggi to describe the pride experienced and expressed in the moments following a personal triumph over adversity. Facial expressions and gestures that demonstrate pride can involve a lifting of the chin, smiles, or arms on hips to demonstrate victory. Individuals may implicitly grant status to others based solely on their expressions of pride, even in cases in which they wish to avoid doing so. Indeed, some studies show that the nonverbal expression of pride conveys a message that is automatically perceived by others about a person's high social status in a group.

Behaviorally, pride can also be expressed by adopting an expanded posture in which the head is tilted back and the arms extended out from the body. This postural display is innate as it is shown in congenitally blind individuals who have lacked the opportunity to see it in others.

Positive outcomes 
A common understanding of pride is that it results from self-directed satisfaction with meeting the personal goals; for example, Weiner et al. have posited that positive performance outcomes elicit pride in an individual when the event is appraised as having been caused by him alone. Moreover, Oveis et al. conceptualize pride as a display of the strong self that promotes feelings of similarity to strong others, as well as differentiation from weak others. Seen in this light, pride can be conceptualized as a hierarchy-enhancing emotion, as its experience and display helps rid negotiations of conflict.
Pride involves exhilarated pleasure and a feeling of accomplishment. It is related to "more positive behaviors and outcomes in the area where the individual is proud" (Weiner, 1985). Pride is generally associated with positive social behaviors such as helping others and outward promotion. Along with hope, it is also often described as an emotion that facilitates performance attainment, as it can help trigger and sustain focused and appetitive effort to prepare for upcoming evaluative events. It may also help enhance the quality and flexibility of the effort expended (Fredrickson, 2001). According to Bagozzi et al., pride can have positive benefits of enhancing creativity, productivity, and altruism. For instance, it has been found that in terms of school achievement, pride is associated with a higher GPA in low neighborhood socioeconomic environments, whereas in more advantaged neighborhoods, pride is associated with a lower GPA.

Economics 
In the field of economic psychology, pride is conceptualized in a spectrum ranging from "proper pride", associated with genuine achievements, and "false pride", which can be maladaptive or even pathological. Lea et al. have examined the role of pride in various economic situations and claim that in all cases pride is involved because economic decisions are not taken in isolation from one another, but are linked together by the selfhood of the people who take them. Understood in this way, pride is an emotional state that works to ensure that people take financial decisions that are in their long-term interests, even when in the short term they would appear irrational.

Sin and self-acceptance 

Inordinate self-esteem is called "pride". Classical Christian theology views pride as being the result of high self-esteem, and thus high self-esteem was viewed as the primary human problem, but beginning in the 20th century, "humanistic psychology" diagnosed the primary human problem as low self-esteem stemming from a lack of belief in one's "true worth". Carl Rogers observed that most people "regard themselves as worthless and unlovable." Thus, they lack self-esteem.

In the King James Bible, people exhibiting excess pride are labeled with the term, "Haughty".

"pride comes before a fall"— 1611, King James Version of the Bible, Book of Proverbs, 16:18

Terry Cooper conceptualized in 2003 excessive pride (along with low self-esteem) as an important paradigm in describing the human condition. He examines and compares the Augustinian-Niebuhrian conviction that pride is primary, the feminist concept of pride as being absent in the experience of women, the humanistic psychology position that pride does not adequately account for anyone's experience, and the humanistic psychology idea that if pride emerges, it is always a false front designed to protect an undervalued self.

He considers that the work of certain neo-Freudian psychoanalysts, namely Karen Horney, offers promise in dealing with what he calls a "deadlock between the overvalued and undervalued self" (Cooper, 112–3).
Cooper refers to their work in describing the connection between religious and psychological pride as well as sin to describe how a neurotic pride system underlies an appearance of self-contempt and low self-esteem:
The "idealized self," the "tyranny of the should," the "pride system" and the nature of self-hate all point toward the intertwined relationship between neurotic pride and self-contempt. Understanding how a neurotic pride system underlies an appearance of self-contempt and low self-esteem. (Cooper, 112–3).

Thus, hubris, which is an exaggerated form of self-esteem, is sometimes actually a lie used to cover the lack of self-esteem the committer of pride feels deep down.

Hubris and group narcissism 

Hubris itself is associated with more intra-individual negative outcomes and is commonly related to expressions of aggression and hostility (Tangney, 1999). As one might expect, Hubris is not necessarily associated with high self-esteem but with highly fluctuating or variable self-esteem. Excessive feelings of hubris have a tendency to create conflict and sometimes terminating close relationships, which has led it to be understood as one of the few emotions with no clear positive or adaptive functions (Rhodwalt, et al.).

Several studies by UC Davis psychologist Cynthia Picket about group pride, have shown that groups that boast, gloat or denigrate others tend to become a group with low social status or to be vulnerable to threats from other groups. Suggesting that "hubristic, pompous displays of group pride might be a sign of group insecurity as opposed to a sign of strength," she states that those that express pride by being filled with humility whilst focusing on members' efforts and hard work tend to achieve high social standing in both the adult public and personal eyes.

Research from the University of Sydney, have found that hubristic pride was positively correlated with arrogance and self-aggrandizement and promotes prejudice and discrimination. But authentic pride was associated with self-confidence and accomplishment and promotes more positive attitudes toward outgroups and stigmatized individuals.

Ethnic

Across the world

Pride in ones own ethnicity or ones own culture seems to universally have positive connotations, though like earlier discussions on pride, when pride tips into hubris, people have been known to commit atrocities.

Types of Pride across the world seem to have a broad variety. The difference of type may have no greater contrast than that between the US and China. In the US, individual pride tends and seems to be held more often in thought. The people in China seem to hold greater views for the nation as a whole.

The value of Pride in the individual or the society as a whole seems to be a running theme and debate among cultures. This debate shadows the discussion on Pride so much so that perhaps the discussion on Pride shouldn't be about whether Pride is necessarily good or bad, but about which form of it is the most useful.

German 

In Germany, "national pride" ("Nationalstolz") is often associated with the former Nazism. Strong displays of national pride are therefore considered poor taste by many Germans. There is an ongoing public debate about the issue of German patriotism. The World Cup in 2006, held in Germany, saw a wave of patriotism sweep the country in a manner not seen for many years. Although many were hesitant to show such blatant support as the hanging of the national flag from windows, as the team progressed through the tournament, so too did the level of support across the nation.

Asian 

Asian pride in modern slang refers mostly to those of East Asian descent, though it can include anyone of Asian descent.  Asian pride was originally fragmented, as Asian nations have had long conflicts with each other, examples are the old Japanese and Chinese religious beliefs of their superiority.  Asian pride emerged prominently during European colonialism.  At one time, Europeans controlled 85% of the world's land through colonialism, resulting in anti-Western feelings among Asian nations.  Today, some Asians still look upon European involvement in their affairs with suspicion. In contrast, Asian empires are prominent and are proudly remembered by adherents to Asian Pride.

There is an emerging discourse of Chinese pride that unfolds complex histories and maps of privileges and empowerments. In a deeper sense, it is a strategic positioning, aligned with approaches such as "Asia as method", to invite more diverse resistances in language, culture, and practices, in challenging colonial, imperial dominations, and being critical of Eurocentric epistemologies. In more specific cases, it examines the Sinophone circulations of power relations connecting the transnational to the local, for example, a particular set of Chinese-Canadian relations between China's increasing industrial materiality and output in which pride becomes an expansionist reach and mobilization of capital, Canada's active interests in tapping into Asian and Chinese labours, markets, and industrial productions, and the intersected cultural politics of 'Chinese-ness' in an East Pacific British Columbia city where 'Chinese' has been tagged as a majority-minority.

Black 

Black pride is a slogan used primarily in the United States to raise awareness for a black racial identity. The slogan has been used by African Americans of sub-Saharan African origin to denote a feeling of self-confidence, self-respect, celebrating one's heritage, and being proud of one's worth.

White 

White pride is a slogan mainly (but not exclusively) used by white separatist, white nationalist, neo-Nazi and white supremacist organizations in the United States for a white race identity. White pride also consists of white ethnic/cultural pride.

Mad 

Mad pride is a worldwide movement and philosophy that mentally ill people should be proud of their madness. It advocates mutual support and rallies for their rights, and aims to popularize the word "mad" as a self-descriptor.

LGBT 

Gay pride is a worldwide movement and philosophy asserting that lesbian, gay, bisexual, and transgender (LGBT) individuals should be proud of their sexual orientation and gender identity. LGBT pride advocates equal rights and benefits for LGBT people. The movement has three main premises: that people should be proud of their sexual orientation and gender identity, that sexual diversity is a gift, and that sexual orientation and gender identity are inherent and cannot be intentionally altered.

The word "pride" is used in this case as an antonym for "shame". It is an affirmation of self and community. The modern gay pride movement began after the Stonewall riots of the late 1960s. In June 1970, the first pride parade in the United States commemorated the one-year anniversary of the Stonewall riots—the nearly week-long uprising between New York City youth and police officers following a raid of Stonewall Inn.

Vanity 

In conventional parlance, vanity sometimes is used in a positive sense to refer to a rational concern for one's appearance, attractiveness, and dress and is thus not the same as pride. However, it also refers to an excessive or irrational belief in one's abilities or attractiveness in the eyes of others and may in so far be compared to pride. The term Vanity originates from the Latin word vanitas meaning emptiness, untruthfulness, futility, foolishness and empty pride. Here empty pride means a fake pride, in the sense of vainglory, unjustified by one's own achievements and actions, but sought by pretense and appeals to superficial characteristics.

In many religions, vanity is considered a form of self-idolatry, in which one rejects God for the sake of one's own image, and thereby becomes divorced from the graces of God. The stories of Lucifer and Narcissus (who gave us the term narcissism), and others, attend to a pernicious aspect of vanity. In Western art, vanity was often symbolized by a peacock, and in Biblical terms, by the Whore of Babylon. During the Renaissance, vanity was invariably represented as a naked woman, sometimes seated or reclining on a couch. She attends to her hair with a comb and mirror. The mirror is sometimes held by a demon or a putto.  Other symbols of vanity include jewels, gold coins, a purse, and often by the figure of death himself.

Often we find an inscription on a scroll that reads Omnia Vanitas ("All is Vanity"), a quote from the Latin translation of the Book of Ecclesiastes.  Although that phrase, itself depicted in a type of still life, vanitas, originally referred not to an obsession with one's appearance, but to the ultimate fruitlessness of man's efforts in this world, the phrase summarizes the complete preoccupation of the subject of the picture.

"The artist invites us to pay lip-service to condemning her", writes Edwin Mullins, "while offering us full permission to drool over her. She admires herself in the glass, while we treat the picture that purports to incriminate her as another kind of glass—a window—through which we peer and secretly desire her." The theme of the recumbent woman often merged artistically with the non-allegorical one of a reclining Venus.

In his table of the seven deadly sins, Hieronymus Bosch depicts a bourgeois woman admiring herself in a mirror held up by a devil. Behind her is an open jewelry box. A painting attributed to Nicolas Tournier, which hangs in the Ashmolean Museum, is An Allegory of Justice and Vanity. A young woman holds a balance, symbolizing justice; she does not look at the mirror or the skull on the table before her. Vermeer's famous painting Girl with a Pearl Earring is sometimes believed to depict the sin of vanity, as the young girl has adorned herself before a glass without further positive allegorical attributes. All is Vanity, by Charles Allan Gilbert (1873–1929), carries on this theme. An optical illusion, the painting depicts what appears to be a large grinning skull. Upon closer examination, it reveals itself to be a young woman gazing at her reflection in the mirror of her vanity table.
Such artistic works served to warn viewers of the ephemeral nature of youthful beauty, as well as the brevity of human life and the inevitability of death.

See also 

 Confidence
 Dunning–Kruger effect
 Grandiose delusions
 Haughtiness
 Hubris
 Narcissism
 Overconfidence effect
 Self-serving bias
 Vanity
 Accomplishment
 Groupthink
 Icarus complex
 Selfishness
 Seven virtues
 The Seven Deadly Sins and the Four Last Things
 Vanity gallery
 Victory disease

Notes

References 
 
 
 Owen, David (2007)  The Hubris Syndrome: Bush, Blair and the Intoxication of Power Politico's, Methuen Publishing Ltd.

Further reading
 

 
Emotions
Psychological attitude